Munna Simon is an Indian actor, who has notably appeared in Malayalam and Tamil films. He has acted in Gaurisankaram, Silandhi, Kandein Kadhalai and Raavanan.

Career

His initial films such as Pallavan, Jananam and Unnai Enakku Pudichirukku were highly unsuccessful films as they failed to create any impact at the box office. He eventually gained attention with the 2008 low-budget thriller Silandhi, following it up with the successful Kandein Kadhalai, appearing alongside Bharath and Tamannaah Bhatia. Subsequently, he was signed by Indian director Mani Ratnam to enact a supporting role in his magnum opus Raavanan, along with prominent film artists Vikram, Aishwarya Rai, Prithviraj and Priyamani.

Personal life 
Munna is the nephew of Malayalam actress Jayabharathi. He graduated from U.C College and further studied physiotherapy in the School of Medical education Angamaly. Munna's only brother Dominic Simon died of Pneumonia on 20 May 2013. Dominic was doing M.Sc. in visual communications in SRM College Chennai.

Filmography

References

External links 
 

21st-century Indian male actors
Living people
Male actors from Chennai
Male actors in Tamil cinema
Male actors in Malayalam cinema
Indian male film actors
1979 births
Male actors from Thrissur